The Genetical Theory of Natural Selection is a book by Ronald Fisher which combines Mendelian genetics with Charles Darwin's theory of natural selection, with Fisher being the first to argue that "Mendelism therefore validates Darwinism" and stating with regard to mutations that "The vast majority of large mutations are deleterious; small mutations are both far more frequent and more likely to be useful", thus refuting orthogenesis. First published in 1930 by The Clarendon Press, it is one of the most important books of the modern synthesis, and helped define population genetics. It is commonly cited in biology books, outlining many concepts that are still considered important such as Fisherian runaway, Fisher's principle, reproductive value, Fisher's fundamental theorem of natural selection, Fisher's geometric model, the sexy son hypothesis, mimicry and the evolution of dominance. It was dictated to his wife in the evenings as he worked at Rothamsted Research in the day.

Contents

In the preface, Fisher considers some general points, including that there must be an understanding of natural selection distinct from that of evolution, and that the then-recent advances in the field of genetics (see history of genetics) now allowed this. In the first chapter, Fisher considers the nature of inheritance, rejecting blending inheritance, because it would eliminate genetic variance, in favour of particulate inheritance. The second chapter introduces Fisher's fundamental theorem of natural selection. The third considers the evolution of dominance, which Fisher believed was strongly influenced by modifiers. Other chapters discuss parental investment, Fisher's geometric model, concerning how spontaneous mutations affect biological fitness, Fisher's principle which explains why the sex ratio between males and females is almost always 1:1, reproductive value, examining the demography of having girl children. Using his knowledge of statistics, the Fisherian runaway, which explores how sexual selection can lead to a positive feedback runaway loop, producing features such as the peacock's plumage. He also wrote about the evolution of dominance, which explores genetic dominance.

Eugenics 
The last five chapters (8-12) include Fisher's concern about dysgenics and proposals for eugenics. Fisher attributed the fall of civilizations to the fertility of their upper classes being diminished, and used British 1911 census data to show an inverse relationship between fertility and social class, partly due, he claimed, to the lower financial costs and hence increasing social status of families with fewer children. He proposed the abolition of extra allowances to large families, with the allowances proportional to the earnings of the father. He served in several official committees to promote eugenics. In 1934, he resigned from the Eugenics Society over a dispute about increasing the power of scientists within the movement.

Editions
A second, slightly revised edition was republished in 1958. In 1999, a third variorum edition, with the original 1930 text, annotated with the 1958 alterations, notes and alterations accidentally omitted from the second edition was published, edited by professor John Henry Bennett of the University of Adelaide.

Dedication
The book is dedicated to Major Leonard Darwin, Fisher's friend, correspondent and son of Charles Darwin, "In gratitude for the encouragement, given to the author, during the last fifteen years, by discussing many of the problems dealt with in this book."

Reviews
The book was reviewed by Charles Galton Darwin, who sent Fisher his copy of the book, with notes in the margin, starting a correspondence which lasted several years. The book also had a major influence on W. D. Hamilton's theories on the genetic basis of kin selection.

John Henry Bennett gave an account of the writing and reception of the book.

Sewall Wright, who had many disagreements with Fisher, reviewed the book and wrote that it was "certain to take rank as one of the major contributions to the theory of evolution." J. B. S. Haldane described it as "brilliant." Reginald Punnett was negative, however.

The book was largely overlooked for 40 years, and in particular Fisher's fundamental theorem of natural selection was misunderstood. The work had a great effect on W. D. Hamilton, who discovered it as an undergraduate at the University of Cambridge and noted in these excerpts from the rear cover of the 1999 variorum edition:

The publication of the variorum edition in 1999 led to renewed interest in the work and reviews by Laurence Cook, Brian Charlesworth, James F. Crow, and A. W. F. Edwards.

References

Bibliography

 
 
 
  "This book is based on a series of lectures delivered in January 1931 at the Prifysgol Cymru, Aberystwyth, and entitled 'A re-examination of Darwinism'."

External links

 
 The Genetical Theory Of Natural Selection

1930 non-fiction books
Books about evolution
Eugenics books
Genetics in the United Kingdom
History of genetics
1930 in biology
Modern synthesis (20th century)